Ben Strong (born September 18, 1986) is an American basketball coach and a retired professional basketball player. Strong is of Native American descent (Red Lake Band of Chippewa Indians).

Playing career

College basketball 
Born in Manassas, Virginia, Strong grew up in Chapel Hill, North Carolina. After graduating from Chapel Hill High School in 2004, he enrolled at Guilford College, an NCAA Division 3 school from Greensboro, North Carolina. He left Guilford ranked second all-time in scoring (2231) as well as in blocked shots (236) and seventh all-time in rebounding (927), taking home various individual awards during his four-year college career, including NCAA Division 3 Player of the Year distinction. Strong won one Old Dominion Athletic Conference (ODAC) championship with Guilford and led the Quakers to two appearances in the NCAA Division III men's basketball tournament. He set an NCAA Division III Tournament record by scoring 59 points in a triple-overtime win over Lincoln University (Pennsylvania) in March 2007.

Professional basketball 
Strong launched his professional career in 2008 with Maccabi Haifa B.C. in the Israeli Premier League. After a stint in the Netherlands and a return to Israel, he took his game to the NBA Development League, where he appeared in a total of 183 regular season (7.7 points, 5.5 rebounds per game) and two post season (20.5ppg, 11.5rpg) contests. In the autumn of 2015, he had a brief stop in Uruguay, playing for Atletico Welcome.

Rounding out his professional career, Strong played his final season in New Zealand with the Nelson Giants and was named Australiabasket.com All-New Zealand NBL Center of the Year.

In 2018, he played for the "We are D3" team at The Basketball Tournament.

Coaching career 
After ending his playing career in 2016, he was named an assistant men's basketball coach at Huntingdon College in the fall of 2016, before joining the Philadelphia 76ers’ staff as a player development specialist in 2018. On June 26, 2019, he joined the Phoenix Suns' staff as a player development coach.

References

External links 
 Profile at australiabasket.com
 Profile at dleague.nba.com

1986 births
Living people
American expatriate basketball people in Israel
American expatriate basketball people in the Netherlands
American expatriate basketball people in New Zealand
American expatriate basketball people in Uruguay
American men's basketball players
Austin Toros players
Basketball coaches from Virginia
Basketball players from North Carolina
Basketball players from Virginia
Centers (basketball)
Chapel Hill High School (Chapel Hill, North Carolina) alumni
Club Atlético Welcome basketball players
Delaware 87ers players
Guilford Quakers men's basketball players
Iowa Energy players
Landstede Hammers players
Maccabi Haifa B.C. players
Native American basketball players
Nelson Giants players
People from Chapel Hill, North Carolina
Phoenix Suns assistant coaches
People from Manassas, Virginia
Power forwards (basketball)
Sportspeople from the Washington metropolitan area
Westchester Knicks players